The 1958 LEN European Aquatics Championships took place in Budapest, Hungary from 31 August until 6 September. In swimming, the 4 × 100 m medley relays for men and women were introduced.

Medal table

Medal summary

Diving
Men's events

Women's events

Swimming

Men's events

Women's events

Water polo

See also
List of European Championships records in swimming

References

 
European Championships
European Aquatics Championships
LEN European Aquatics Championships
International aquatics competitions hosted by Hungary
European Aquatics
European Aquatics Championships
European Aquatics Championships
European Aquatics Championships, 1958